The Macon County School District is a public school district in Macon County, Georgia, United States, based in Oglethorpe. It serves the communities of Ideal, Marshallville, Montezuma, and Oglethorpe.

Schools
The Macon County School District has one elementary school, one middle school, and one high school.

Elementary schools
Macon County Elementary School

Middle school
Macon County Middle School

High school
Macon County High School

References

External links

School districts in Georgia (U.S. state)
Education in Macon County, Georgia